is a Japanese video game composer and sound effects designer best known for scoring several Pokémon games.

Biography
In 2003, Tawada composed the music to Pokémon Colosseum, a video game made by the development studio Genius Sonority. He has since scored the subsequent Pokémon titles developed by the company: the sequel to Pokémon Colosseum, Pokémon XD: Gale of Darkness (2005), the puzzle video game, Pokémon Trozei! (Pokémon Link! in Europe), and Pokémon Battle Revolution (2006).

Works
All works listed below were composed by Tawada unless otherwise noted.

Video games

Other works
Ten Plants (1998) – with many others

References

External links
YouTube Channel
SoundCloud

1965 births
Japanese composers
Japanese male composers
Living people
Video game composers